Angel de Maldonado, O. Cist. (1660–1728) was a Roman Catholic prelate who served as Bishop of Antequera (1700–1728).

Biography
Angel de Maldonado was born in  Ocaña, Spain in 1660 and ordained a priest in the Cistercian Order.
On 21 June 1700, he was appointed during the papacy of Pope Innocent XII as Bishop of Antequera.
On 2 January 1701, he was consecrated bishop by Francesco Acquaviva d'Aragona, Titular Archbishop of Larissa in Thessalia, with Gregorio Solórzano Castillo, Bishop of Ávila, and Francisco Zapata Vera y Morales, Titular Bishop of Dara, serving as co-consecrators. 
He served as Bishop of Antequera until his death on 17 April 1728.

While bishop, he was the principal consecrator of Juan Benito Garret y Arlovi, Bishop of Nicaragua (1710); and José Pérez de Lanciego Eguiluz y Mirafuentes, Archbishop of México (1714).

References

External links and additional sources
 (for Chronology of Bishops) 
 (for Chronology of Bishops) 

18th-century Roman Catholic bishops in Mexico
Bishops appointed by Pope Innocent XII
1660 births
1728 deaths
People from the Province of Toledo